The Cowboy and the Countess is a 1926 American silent Western film directed by Roy William Neill and starring Buck Jones, Helena D'Algy, and Diana Miller.

Plot
As described in a film magazine review, Jerry Whipple, daredevil of the Western range, rescues the Countess Justina and her party when their car is wrecked in a storm. Jerry falls in love with the Countess. Later, he tours Europe with his cowboy pals as part of a wild west show. The Duke de Milos has loaned Countess' father money on the condition that the daughter would become his bride. Jerry puts on a wild west show in the palace court and later kidnaps the Countess whom he later weds.

Cast

References

Bibliography
 Solomon, Aubrey. The Fox Film Corporation, 1915-1935: A History and Filmography. McFarland, 2011.

External links
 

1926 films
1926 Western (genre) films
Fox Film films
Films directed by Roy William Neill
American black-and-white films
Silent American Western (genre) films
1920s English-language films
1920s American films